Edgar Montilion "Monty" Woolley (August 17, 1888May 6, 1963) was an American film and theater actor. At the age of 50, he achieved a measure of stardom for his role in the 1939 stage play The Man Who Came to Dinner and its 1942 film adaptation. His distinctive white beard was his trademark and he was affectionately known as "The Beard."

Early life
Woolley was born in New York City's Manhattan to William Edgar Woolley (1845-1927) and Jessie née Arms (1857-1927) and grew up in the highest social circles. Woolley received a bachelor's degree at Yale University, where Cole Porter was an intimate friend and classmate, and master's degrees from Yale and Harvard Universities. He eventually became an assistant professor of English and drama coach at Yale. Thornton Wilder and Stephen Vincent Benét were among his students. He served in World War I in the United States Army as a first lieutenant assigned to the general staff in Paris.

Acting career

Woolley began directing on Broadway in 1929 with Fifty Million Frenchmen, and began acting there in 1936 after leaving his academic career. In 1939 he starred in the Kaufman and Hart comedy The Man Who Came to Dinner for 783 performances. It was for this well-reviewed role he was typecast as the wasp-tongued, supercilious sophisticate.

Woolley signed with 20th Century Fox in the 1940s and appeared in many films through the mid-1950s. His most famous film role, a reprise of his Broadway role, was in 1942's The Man Who Came To Dinner in which he plays a cranky radio wag restricted to a wheelchair because of a seemingly injured hip, a caricature of the legendary pundit Alexander Woollcott. The film received a good review from the New York Times. He played himself   in Warner Bros.' fictionalized film biography of Cole Porter, Night and Day (1946), and the role of Professor Wutheridge in The Bishop's Wife (1947). In the comedy As Young as You Feel (1951) he played a printer who, fired routinely from his job at 65 years old, poses as an executive to get his job back.

He was also a frequent radio guest performer, first appearing in the medium as a foil to Al Jolson. Woolley became a familiar guest on such shows as The Fred Allen Show, Duffy's Tavern, The Big Show, The Chase and Sanborn Hour with Edgar Bergen and Charlie McCarthy, and others. In 1950, Woolley landed the starring  role in the NBC series The Magnificent Montague. He played a former Shakespearean actor whose long fall onto hard times forced him to swallow his pride and take a role on daily network radio, becoming an unlikely star while sparring with his wife, Lily (Anne Seymour), and his wise-cracking maid, Agnes (Pert Kelton). The show lasted from November 1950 through September 1951.

Woolley first appeared on television in cameos, then in his own dramatic play series On Stage with Monty Woolley.<ref name="S.Gazette">"Monty Woolley to Appear in a Series of Television Films". ''Schenectady Gazette, NY, July 11, 1953. p. 8. Retrieved August 9, 2010.</ref> He starred in a CBS TV adaptation of The Man Who Came to Dinner in 1954, which he and some reviewers lambasted,Gould, Jack. (October 15, 1954).  "Television in Review; Bite Taken Out of Man Who Came to Dinner". New York Times. Retrieved August 9, 2010. and appeared in other televised dramas in the series Best of Broadway.

After completing his last film, Kismet (1955), he returned to radio for about a year, after which he was forced to retire due to ill health.

Woolley was nominated twice for an Academy Award, as Best Actor in 1943 for The Pied Piper and as Best Supporting Actor in 1945 for Since You Went Away.  He won a Best Actor award from the National Board of Review in 1942 for his role in The Pied Piper.

His hands and beard were impressed in the pavement of Grauman's Chinese Theatre in 1943.1940s . Grauman's Chinese Theatre Woolley received a star on the Hollywood Walk of Fame in 1960, officially listed in the "Motion Picture" category, though his star bears the television emblem. The error of the television emblem was evident, considering his only TV efforts were his classic role as 'Sheridan Whiteside' in a 1954 TV adaptation of "The Man Who Came to Dinner", and another cast in a small role in an episode of a short-lived series called "Five Fingers" in 1959.

Personal life
Woolley and Cole Porter enjoyed many adventures together in New York and on foreign travels, although Porter reportedly disapproved of Woolley taking a black man as his lover.
Woolley has been described in scholarly and other works as gay and closeted.

Starting in 1939, Woolley was living with a gay companion, Cary Abbott, who had also graduated from Yale in 1911. Abbott was discreetly identified publicly as Woolley's "courier-secretary-traveling companion." In 1942, Woolley and Abbott moved into a house in Saratoga Springs, where they lived together until Abbott's death, at age 58, from lung cancer, in 1948.

According to Bennett Cerf in his 1944 book Try and Stop Me, Woolley was at a dinner party and suddenly belched. A woman sitting nearby glared at him; he glared back and said, "And what did you expect, my good woman?  Chimes?" Cerf wrote, "Woolley was so pleased with this line that he insisted it be written into his next role in Hollywood."Cerf,  p. 57. (remainder of quote).

In 1943, Alfred Hitchcock wrote a mystery story for Look titled "The Murder of Monty Woolley."

Death
On April 6, 1963, Woolley was taken to the Saratoga Springs Hospital with heart problems, and two days later transferred to the Albany Hospital. He died of complications from kidney and heart ailments on May 6, 1963, in Albany, New York, aged 74. He is interred at the Greenridge Cemetery, Saratoga Springs, Saratoga County, New York.

Stage
Fifty Million Frenchmen (1929) - Director 
The Second Little Show (1930) - Director 
The New Yorkers (1930) - Director 
America's Sweetheart (1931) - Director 
Walk a Little Faster (1933) - Book director 
Champagne, Sec (1933) - Director 
Jubilee (1935) - Dialogue director 
On Your Toes (1936) - Sergei Alexandrovitch 
Knights of Song (1938) - His Royal Highness, Albert Edward 
The Man Who Came to Dinner (1939) - Sheridan WhitesideGreen, p. 455.

Complete filmography

 Ladies in Love (1936) (uncredited and unconfirmed)
 Live, Love and Learn (1937) - Mr. Bawltitude
 Nothing Sacred (1937) - Dr. Oswald Vunch (uncredited)
 Everybody Sing (1938) - John Fleming
 Arsène Lupin Returns (1938) - Georges Bouchet
 The Girl of the Golden West (1938) - Governor
 The Forgotten Step (1938 short) - The Art Collector
 Three Comrades (1938) - Dr. Jaffe
 Lord Jeff (1938) - Jeweler
 Vacation from Love (1938) - Wedding Guest in Car (uncredited)
 Young Dr. Kildare (1938) - Dr. Lane-Porteus
 Artists and Models Abroad (1938) - Gantvoort
 Zaza (1939) - Fouget
 Midnight (1939) - The Judge
 Never Say Die (1939) - Dr. Schmidt
 Man About Town (1939) - Henri Dubois
 Honeymoon in Bali (1939) - Parker, Smitty's Publisher (uncredited)
 Dancing Co-Ed (1939) - Professor Lange
 See Your Doctor (1939 short) - Doctor (uncredited)
 The Man Who Came to Dinner (1942) - Sheridan Whiteside
 The Pied Piper (1942) - John Sidney Howard
 Life Begins at Eight-Thirty (1942) - Madden Thomas
 Holy Matrimony (1943) - Priam Farll
 Since You Went Away (1944) - Col. William G. Smollett
 Irish Eyes Are Smiling (1944) - Edgar Brawley
 Molly and Me (1945) - John Graham
 Night and Day (1946) - himself
 Paris 1900 (1947 documentary) - Narrator (US version)
 The Bishop's Wife (1947) - Professor Wutheridge
 Miss Tatlock's Millions (1948) - Miles Tatlock
 As Young as You Feel (1951) - John R. Hodges
 Kismet (1955) - Omar

Radio appearances

 References Notes'''

External links

1888 births
1963 deaths
American male stage actors
American male film actors
American male radio actors
American male television actors
Harvard University alumni
Yale University alumni
LGBT people from New York (state)
American gay actors
United States Army officers
United States Army personnel of World War I
Yale University faculty
People from Saratoga Springs, New York
Burials at Greenridge Cemetery
20th-century American male actors